Frank Joseph Martin  (July 29, 1878 – September 2, 1942) was a Major League Baseball third baseman.

Sources

Major League Baseball third basemen
Louisville Colonels players
Baseball players from Denver
1878 births
1942 deaths
19th-century baseball players
Buffalo Bisons (minor league) players
Cleveland Lake Shores players
Danville Champions players
Little Rock Travelers players
Minneapolis Millers (baseball) players
Indianapolis Indians players
St. Paul Saints (AA) players
Duluth White Sox players